Zabrak  is a village in Balkhab District, Sar-e Pol Province, in northern Afghanistan. It lies north of Gawanak, south of Alar, and west of Jawak and Chiras. The nearest major towns are Mazar-i-Sharif to the northeast and Meymaneh to the northwest.

See also
 Sar-e Pol Province

References

Populated places in Sar-e Pol Province